Achaete-scute complex homolog 2 (Drosophila), also known as ASCL2, is an imprinted human gene.

Function 
This gene is a member of the basic helix-loop-helix (BHLH) family of transcription factors. It activates transcription by binding to the E box (5'-CANNTG-3'). Dimerization with other BHLH proteins is required for efficient DNA binding. Involved in the determination of the neuronal precursors in the peripheral nervous system and the central nervous system.

Ascl2 plays a critical role in early gestation, with its products showing up in the oocyte and the two-cell stage of the zygote. This gene has its primary role after implantation of the developing embryo. It is expressed in trophoblast cells on the maternal allele. Its expression is required for the progenitor cells within the ectoplacental cone (EPC), which establishes the first functional maternal-fetal interactions before placental development is completed. The ectoplacental cone continues to develop and differentiate into other cell types which express the Ascl2 gene in the differentiated derivatives. It is specifically found in the spongiotrophoblast cells of the junctional zone. In the mature placenta, glycogen trophoblast (Gly2) cells are found in the junctional zone. Without Ascl2, the GlyT cells are not found and even though these cells develop later in gestation, its progenitor cells are established early on. If a null allele is inherited, the embryo will fail to develop. Insufficient Ascl2 function is also associated with a placenta that has phenotypic defects, which leads to growth retardation.

Achaete-scute complex homolog 2 (ASCL2) is a maternally expressed imprinted gene that codes is a part of the basic helix-loop-helix (BHLH) transcription factor family. ASCL2 is particularly important during implantation of the developing embryo, specifically in placental development and neuronal precursor determination. Loss of function of ASCL2 will result in embryonic failure. In 2006, ASCL2 was observed to be involved in tumor progression, specifically, ASCL2 was reported to be upregulated in colorectal tumors (Jubb et al). In 2010, Tian et al reported that ASCL2’s involvement in metastasis could be attributed by ASCL2-promoted cellular self-renewal as opposed to cellular differentiation. In 2019, Farmarzi reported a potential link between ASCL2 and breast cancer tumorigenesis which had never previously been demonstrated. ASCL2 expression was noted in multiple breast cancer cell lines, most notably in MCF7 cells. siRNA KO of ASCL2 was shown to inhibit cellular migration of breast cancer cells. Further, ASCL2 knockdown altered the expression of BIRC5 and CD44, which are Wnt-associated genes.

Interactions 
ASCL2 has been shown to interact with NCOA6 and RBBP5.

References

External links

Further reading